Trechus aubei is a species of ground beetle in the subfamily Trechinae. It was described by Pandelle in 1867.

References

aubei
Beetles described in 1867